Keneil Moodie (born 29 July 1986) is a Jamaican international footballer who plays for Montego Bay Utd, as a midfielder.

Club career
Moodie has played club football for Reno, Seba United and Waterhouse, before joining Montego Bay.

International career
He made his international debut for Jamaica in 2005, and has appeared in FIFA World Cup qualifying matches.

References

1986 births
Living people
Jamaican footballers
Jamaica international footballers
Waterhouse F.C. players
Montego Bay United F.C. players
Association football midfielders